Former pupils of Gordonstoun in Moray are known as Gordonstounians. They include the following individuals. See also The Category for Gordonstounians

Royalty and aristocracy
 
Alexander, Crown Prince of Yugoslavia
Mohammed Bin Zayed Al Nahyan, Crown Prince of Abu Dhabi 
Prince Andrew, Duke of York
Prince Philip, Duke of Edinburgh
King Charles III
Lord Ivar Mountbatten
Peter Phillips
Zara Phillips
Angus Montagu, 12th Duke of Manchester
Paul-Philippe Hohenzollern
Granville Gordon, 13th Marquess of Huntly
Alexander Douglas-Hamilton, 16th Duke of Hamilton
Michael Pearson, 4th Viscount Cowdray
John Grant, 13th Earl of Dysart
James Carnegie, 3rd Duke of Fife
Prince Edward, Earl of Wessex
Norton Knatchbull, 8th Baron Brabourne
Jasper Duncombe, 7th Baron Feversham
Nicholas Alexander, 7th Earl of Caledon

Culture
Duncan Jones, formerly known as Zowie Bowie – film director and son of musician David Bowie
Jason Connery, actor and son of actor Sean Connery
Alistair Gosling – Founder of Extreme Sports Channel and Extreme International

Artists

Music
Roy Williamson of the Corries – musician, writer of Flower of Scotland, one of two unofficial Scottish national anthems
Dick Heckstall-Smith – musician
Luca Prodan – musician
 Barry Cooper – musicologist
 Jo Hamilton – musician

Writers – poets, novelists, dramatists
William Boyd – writer
Allan Scott (Scottish screenwriter)

Journalists and biographers 

 Isabel Oakeshott

Science

 Francis Huxley - anthropologist
 David Stronach - archaeologist

Lawyers and judges

Military

Politics

Stuart Agnew - UKIP MEP

Business
John Barton – Chairman of Next plc and EasyJet

Sport
Heather Stanning – rower, Olympic gold medallist at London 2012 with Helen Glover

Rugby players

Fictional
Gordonstoun also has a notable fictional alumna, the heroine of Tomb Raider, Lara Croft was supposed to have attended the school in sixth year, and has also been used to advertise it.

References 

Gordonstoun